Nicolas Verdier (born 17 January 1987) is a French professional footballer who plays as a striker.

Career
Verdier started his career at Cannes and made his debut for the club on 20 May 2005, coming on as a second-half substitute for Stéphane Calcé in the 0–1 away defeat at Pau. He scored his first senior goal on 10 February 2006, scoring the third in the 3–1 home win over Nîmes after replacing Madjid Bouabdallah. In total, Verdier played 15 league matches for Cannes before being released in 2008 and subsequently joining Division d'Honneur club Draguignan. In January 2009, he was signed by Boulogne, but failed to make an appearance for the side and left in the summer of that year.

Verdier spent the 2009–10 season with seventh-tier outfit Cagnes-sur-Mer before joining Arles-Avignon ahead of the 2010–11 campaign. He made a number of appearances for the reserve team at Arles but could not break into the first-team squad and was consequently released and signed for Championnat National outfit Gazélec Ajaccio in the summer of 2011. Verdier made his Gazélec debut in the goalless draw with Quevilly on 26 August 2011, playing the first hour before being replaced by Quentin Boesso. He scored his first goal for the club in the 1–0 win over Colmar three games later and became a first-team regular during the 2011–12 season, scoring 14 goals in 33 league matches as the team won promotion to Ligue 2. In the 2012–13 season he scored 4 goals in 23 league appearances. He played in Ligue 2 again in the 2013–14 season, having joined newly relegated side Stade Brestois 29.

In July 2018, he signed a contract with Stade Lavallois. In June 2019, he signed for Red Star.

References

External links
 Nicolas Verdier career statistics at foot-national.com
 
 

1987 births
Living people
Footballers from Nice
French footballers
French expatriate footballers
Association football forwards
AS Cannes players
SC Draguignan players
US Boulogne players
AC Arlésien players
Gazélec Ajaccio players
Stade Brestois 29 players
K.V. Mechelen players
K.A.S. Eupen players
Stade Lavallois players
Red Star F.C. players
Ligue 2 players
Championnat National players
Belgian Pro League players
Expatriate footballers in Belgium